Generator is the sixth studio album by the punk rock band Bad Religion. Although the album was completed in the spring of 1991, it was not released until 1992; the band was not happy with the artwork and packaging, and went through several ideas that were eventually scrapped. Generator was the band's first release with drummer Bobby Schayer, who replaced Pete Finestone during the Against the Grain tour.

Generator includes some fan favorites and concert staples, such as, "Generator", "No Direction", "Heaven Is Falling", "Atomic Garden", and "The Answer". The album was promoted with Bad Religion's first music video, which was filmed for the song "Atomic Garden".

Production and marketing

Generator marked a shift in songwriting-style for the band. Although many songs hold true to their hardcore-punk roots ("Generator", "Tomorrow", "Fertile Crescent"), select tracks suggested the band moving towards a slower, more experimental route ("Two Babies In The Dark", "The Answer"), as well as a darker one ("Atomic Garden"). While not as dark, this experimental period would continue through their next album, 1993's Recipe For Hate.

Writing sessions for Generator began around late 1990/early 1991. After Schayer joined Bad Religion in April 1991, the band immediately started work on their follow-up to Against the Grain. With an intended release date of mid-to-late 1991, they recorded it at Westbeach Recorders in Hollywood, California in May of that year.

Generator was recorded almost live in the studio, because, at the time, guitarist Brett Gurewitz had moved Westbeach to larger premises, and for the first time, the entire band could play in the studio at the same time. He stated that it was "time to change" and the band "did it in a different studio, but as far as the songwriting, it was a deliberate effort to try something different".

Reissue
Along with Bad Religion's first five albums (minus Into the Unknown), Epitaph Records released a remastered version of Generator on April 6, 2004, with two exclusive tracks that were taken from the split 7-inch with Noam Chomsky issued by Maximum Rock'N Roll in 1991. These versions feature Finestone on drums, making it his final recordings with Bad Religion.

Reception and awards

According to The Bad Religion Page, 100,000 copies of the album were shipped. By April 1992, Generator had sold approximately 85,000 copies, becoming Bad Religion's second best-selling album at the time (their previous album Against the Grain had sold 90,000 copies, while Suffer and No Control sold approximately 88,000 and 80,000 respectively).

In October 2011, the album was ranked number three on Guitar World magazine's top ten list of guitar albums of 1992.

Track listing

2004 CD reissue bonus tracks

Prior to the recording of the album, these tracks were part of the 7-inch split with Noam Chomsky, issued by Maximum Rock 'N' Roll as part of an anti-Gulf War benefit.

Personnel
 Greg Graffin – lead vocals
 Greg Hetson – guitar
 Brett Gurewitz – guitar, backing vocals
 Jay Bentley – bass guitar, backing vocals
 Bobby Schayer – drums, percussion
Pete Finestone – drums, percussion on tracks 12 and 13
 The Legendary Starbolt – engineering
 Donnell Cameron – engineering
 Joe Peccerillo – assistant engineering
 Eddie Schreyer – mastering
 Norman Moore – art direction, photography
 The Douglas Brothers – photography
 Merlyn Rosenberg – photography
 Gregor Verbinski – photography

See also
List of anti-war songs

References

External links

Generator (reissue) at YouTube (streamed copy where licensed)

Bad Religion albums
1992 albums
Epitaph Records albums